Ramindu Nikeshala (born 16 July 1996) is a Sri Lankan cricketer. He made his Twenty20 debut for Badureliya Sports Club in the 2017–18 SLC Twenty20 Tournament on 25 February 2018.

References

External links
 

1996 births
Living people
Sri Lankan cricketers
Badureliya Sports Club cricketers
Place of birth missing (living people)